The name St Mary de Castro or St Mary in Castro is given to many churches dedicated to the Virgin Mary within a medieval castle (the Latin, de castro or in castro, meaning 'in the castle'), including:
St Mary in Castro, Dover, a church in the grounds of Dover Castle, Kent, south-east England
Church of St Mary de Castro, Leicester, a church in Leicester, England, located within the former bailey of Leicester Castle